Portrait of a Man (c. 1460–1470) is a painting attributed to the Italian   Renaissance artist Andrea Mantegna. It is housed in the National Gallery of Art, Washington, DC, United States.

History
The work is generally dated to the same years of the Camera degli Sposi, or anyway from the 1460s-1470s, due to the similarities of the subject with one of the characters portrayed there.

The panel is documented for the first time in 1906, in a private collection at Gaál, Hungary. Later it was part of collections in Budapest, Paris and then New York City. In 1950 it was acquired by the Samuel H. Kress, becoming part of the National Collection.

It has been attributed also to Giovanni Bellini or to an unknown pupil of Mantegna.

Sources

External links
Page at museum's official website

Paintings by Andrea Mantegna
1460s paintings
Collections of the National Gallery of Art
Man, Mantegna